Little Cedar River may refer to:

 Little Cedar River (Dodge County, Minnesota), a tributary of the Cedar River entirety in Dodge County
 Little Cedar River (Iowa and Minnesota), a tributary of the Cedar River rising in Mower County, Minnesota
 Little Cedar River (Menominee River tributary), in Menominee County, Michigan
 Little Cedar River (Tobacco River tributary), in Gladwin County, Michigan

See also 
 Cedar River (disambiguation)